The expedition of Abu Amir Al-Ashari, took place in January 630 AD or 8AH, 10th month, of the Islamic Calendar, in Autas.

Expedition
In this expedition, Muhammad dispatched a number of Muslims under the leadership of Abu ‘Amir Al-Ashari. The Muslims chased the enemy, after which a skirmish took place, and the leader of the platoon, Abu Amir was killed.

Islamic primary sources

The event is mentioned by the Muslim Jurist Muhammad ibn Jarir al-Tabari as follows:

The event is mentioned in the Sunni Hadith collection, Sahih al-Bukhari as follows:

See also
Military career of Muhammad
List of expeditions of Muhammad

References

630
Campaigns ordered by Muhammad